NXT UK TakeOver: Dublin was a scheduled professional wrestling show and WWE Network event that would have been produced by WWE. It would have been the fourth NXT UK TakeOver event held exclusively for wrestlers from the promotion's NXT UK brand division. The event was scheduled to take place at the 3Arena in Dublin, Ireland, which would have made it the first NXT UK TakeOver held outside the United Kingdom.

The event was originally to be held on 26 April 2020, but was rescheduled to 25 October due to the COVID-19 pandemic, which began affecting all of WWE's programming in mid-March that year. However, due to the ongoing pandemic, the event was rescheduled once again, this time to 20 June 2021. However, on 30 April, the event was officially cancelled.

Production

Background
TakeOver was a series of professional wrestling shows that began on 29 May 2014, when WWE's NXT brand held their second live special on the WWE Network. The NXT UK brand debuted in June 2018 and subsequently adopted the TakeOver name for their live WWE Network specials, beginning with NXT UK TakeOver: Blackpool in January 2019. TakeOver: Dublin would have been the fourth NXT UK TakeOver event. It was scheduled to be held at the 3Arena and was named after the venue's city of Dublin, Ireland. It would have marked the first NXT UK TakeOver event held outside the United Kingdom.

TakeOver: Dublin was originally scheduled to take place on 26 April 2020. Due to the COVID-19 pandemic, however, the event was postponed and rescheduled to occur on 25 October. The ongoing pandemic caused the event to be rescheduled again, this time to 20 June 2021. However, on 30 April, the event was removed from the 3Arena's scheduled events, and WWE confirmed that they had cancelled the event.

References

External links
 

Dublin
2021 in Ireland
2021 in professional wrestling
Events in Dublin (city)
Professional wrestling in Ireland
Sports events cancelled due to the COVID-19 pandemic
Cancelled events in Ireland